Ardentinny is a small village on the western shore of Loch Long,  north of Dunoon on the Cowal peninsula in Argyll and Bute, Scottish Highlands.

Nearby is Cruach a Chaise (Cheese Hill), while on the opposite side of Loch Long is the village of Coulport, home of RNAD Coulport, the storage and loading base for the UK's Trident Nuclear Defence Force.

The name Ardentinny means "hill of fire", deriving either from the ancient rite of lighting fires to the god Bel on 1 May or, more likely, from warning fires to aid mariners. It was the fife of the McInturner's Baron's Craigcoll, Ardentinny & Glenfinart before they were murdered by Clan Campbell for supporting Clan Lamont in the reign of Robert the Bruce. The ferry between Ardentinny and Coulport was summoned by a fire and was used by the Dukes of Argyll travelling between Dunoon, Inveraray and Rosneath Castle and in later years by drovers from Argyll travelling to the markets in Central Scotland.

The village has two hotels catering for the general public. The Ardentinny Outdoor Centre is run by Actual Reality, which has two centres in Cowal.

The local economy is reliant on tourism and agriculture, with major employers being the hotel, the outdoor centre and the caravan park. There is one working fishing boat based in Ardentinny, trawling for prawns. Residents also work in Dunoon and across the Clyde. The village is served by the 489 (direct) and 486 (via Kilmun) bus service to and from Dunoon.

There are many holiday home rentals now being offered to tourists, as Ardentinny is within Argyll Forest Park, which is itself within Loch Lomond and The Trossachs National Park.

The Ardentinny Hotel was struck by lightning on 19 May 2014. It re-opened in June 2017, after refurbishment, as a bar and bistro named The Ardentinny.

Education
Ardentinny had a primary school until 1998, when it was closed due to falling pupil numbers. Children in the village are now sent to nearby Strone Primary School. The only secondary school in Cowal is Dunoon Grammar School, and students from the village are bussed there each day.

In literature
The village of Ardentinny is featured in Don Brown's historical fiction novel Destiny, the prequel to his Navy Justice Series.

Notable people
John Craig, Scottish classicist, and his brother Robert Meldrum Craig, FRSE, were born in Ardentinny.
George Gardner, botanist, was born in Ardentinny in 1810.
Paul Murton, TV presenter/broadcaster of the Grand Tours of Scotland series, was raised in Ardentinny.

Gallery

References

External links

 Argyll Forest Park - website
 The Loch Lomond and The Trossachs National Park - website
 Ardentinny Community Website

Villages in Cowal
Firth of Clyde
Highlands and Islands of Scotland